Steven Alfred (born 11 October 1997) is a Nigerian footballer who plays for Israeli side Hapoel Hadera.

Club career
Alfred made his debut in the Russian Football National League for PFC Sochi on 16 March 2019 in a game against FC Krasnodar-2.

On 5 July 2019, Alfred joined FC Pyunik on loan. On 26 January 2021, Alfred left Pyunik by mutual consent.

Career statistics

Club

References

External links
 Profile by Russian Football National League

1997 births
Living people
Nigerian footballers
Association football forwards
FC Saxan players
PFC Sochi players
FC Pyunik players
FC Slutsk players
Hapoel Hadera F.C. players
Russian First League players
Armenian Premier League players
Belarusian Premier League players
Israeli Premier League players
Nigerian expatriate footballers
Expatriate footballers in Moldova
Expatriate footballers in Russia
Expatriate footballers in Armenia
Expatriate footballers in Belarus
Expatriate footballers in Israel
Nigerian expatriate sportspeople in Moldova
Nigerian expatriate sportspeople in Russia
Nigerian expatriate sportspeople in Armenia
Nigerian expatriate sportspeople in Belarus
Nigerian expatriate sportspeople in Israel